Board of Education Building may refer to:

Board of Education Building (St. Louis, Missouri), A building in St. Louis County, Missouri, which is listed on the National Register of Historic Places
Board of Education Building (Philadelphia), the former administration building of the School District of Philadelphia